James Franklin Hitchcock Jr. (June 28, 1911 – July 23, 1959) was an American college football player and Major League Baseball player during the Depression Era. Hitchcock played for the Auburn Tigers football team of Auburn University (then Alabama Polytechnic Institute), where he was the school's first All-American in both football and baseball.

Early years
Jimmy Hitchcock was born on June 28, 1911 in Inverness, Alabama to James Franklin Hitchcock, clerk of the circuit court in Bullock County, and Sallie Louise Davis.

Auburn
Known as "The Phantom of Union Springs", where he played in high school, Hitchcock earned three varsity football letters at Auburn from 1930 to 1932. As a triple-threat halfback, he led his team to the 1932 Southern Conference championship. Hitchcock was named a member of the 1932 Walter Camp College Football All-America Team and was inducted into the National Football Foundation's College Football Hall of Fame in 1954.  He was a member of an All-time Auburn Tigers football team selected in 1935. He was posthumously inducted into the Helms Athletic Foundation Hall of Fame in 1966 and the Alabama Sports Hall of Fame in 1969. He was nominated though not selected for an Associated Press All-Time Southeast 1920-1969 era team.

Baseball
Hitchcock was also a letterman in baseball and garnered All-America honors. Following his playing career, Hitchcock returned to Auburn as head baseball coach and assistant football coach (backfield). He also took a position on the Auburn University Board of Trustees which was responsible for the hiring of legendary football coach "Shug" Jordan. Auburn's baseball facility, Hitchcock Field at Plainsman Park, is named in honor of Jimmy and his younger brother, Billy Hitchcock, who played and managed in the majors.

Major League Baseball
He played professional baseball for nine seasons (1933–40; 1946), including a stint as the shortstop for the Boston Bees (now known as the Atlanta Braves) of the National League in 1938. Hitchcock saw action in only 28 games. He collected 13 hits (all singles) and three bases on balls in 79 plate appearances, hitting .171 with seven runs batted in.

After college
Outside of sports, Hitchcock served in the United States Navy in World War II. He later parlayed his popularity in Alabama into a political position on the Alabama Public Service Commission, for which he served until his death in 1959.

References

External links

 Jimmy Hitchcock at SABR (Baseball BioProject)

1911 births
1959 deaths
All-American college football players
All-Southern college football players
American athlete-politicians
American football halfbacks
American football punters
American football quarterbacks
Auburn Tigers baseball coaches
Auburn Tigers baseball players
Auburn Tigers football players
Baseball players from Alabama
Binghamton Triplets players
Boston Bees players
Chattanooga Lookouts players
Columbus Red Birds players
Major League Baseball shortstops
Newark Bears (IL) players
Oakland Oaks (baseball) players
People from Bullock County, Alabama
Players of American football from Alabama
Rochester Red Wings players
Wheeling Stogies players
United States Navy personnel of World War II